Nankervis  may refer to:

People
 Brian Nankervis (born 1956), Australian writer and comedian
 Bruce Nankervis (born 1950), Australian Rules footballer
 Ian Nankervis (footballer, born 1944) (born 1944), Australian rules footballer
 Ian Nankervis (born 1948), Australian Rules footballer
 Stephen Nankervis, Australian Rules footballer
 Toby Nankervis (born 1994), Australian Rules footballer
 Vic Nankervis (footballer, born 1893) (1893–1973), Australian Rules footballer
 Vic Nankervis (footballer, born 1918) (1918–1986), Australian Rules footballer

Places
 Nankervis Hut, alternative name for Geehi Hut, a mountain hut in New South Wales, Australia